The 1966 European Karate Championships, the 1st edition, was held in Paris, France from May 7 to 9, 1966.  In 1961, Jacques Delcourt was appointed President of French Karate Federation, which was at that stage an associated member of the Judo Federation. In 1963 he invited the six other known European federations (Italy, Great Britain, Belgium, Germany, Switzerland and Spain) to come to France for the first-ever international karate event, and Great Britain and Belgium accepted the invitation.

Medalists

Medal table

References

1966
International sports competitions hosted by France
1966 in French sport
European Championships, 1966
International sports competitions hosted by Paris
1966 in Paris
European Championships, 1966
May 1966 sports events in Europe